The National Union of Writers and Artists of Cuba (Unión Nacional de Escritores y Artistas de Cuba, UNEAC) is a social, cultural and professional  organization of writers, musicians, actors, painters, sculptors, and artist of different genres.  It was founded on August 22, 1961, by the Cuban poet, Nicolas Guillen. Initially their objective was uniting the intellectuals within the young Cuban Revolution to maintain a genuine Cuban culture. The group issued La Gaceta de Cuba beginning in 1962. Cuban violinist and professor Evelio Tieles was President of the Music Section from 1977 to 1984.

Manuel Vázquez Portal was expelled from UNEAC because of his dissident views.

See also 
 Ediciones El Puente
 Roger Aguilar Labrada

References

External links
 National Union of Writers and Artists of Cuba webpage

Cultural organizations based in Cuba
Arts organizations established in 1961
1961 establishments in Cuba